Fresno de la Vega, Fresnu de la Veiga in Leonese language, is a municipality located in the province of León, Castile and León, Spain. According to the 2004 census (INE), the municipality has a population of 645 inhabitants. Fresno is known locally for its unique variety of large Spanish peppers, called morrón. The village has a small market which sells retail quantities of locally grown produce. During the last Sunday of September the village hosts a 'Pepper Fair'.

References

Municipalities in the Province of León